Timeline of the COVID-19 pandemic in Wales may refer to:

Timeline of the COVID-19 pandemic in Wales (2020)
Timeline of the COVID-19 pandemic in Wales (2021)
Timeline of the COVID-19 pandemic in Wales (2022)

Wales